Plymale Branch is a stream in the U.S. state of West Virginia.

Plymale Branch was named after John Plymale, a pioneer who settled there.

See also
List of rivers of West Virginia

References

Rivers of Wayne County, West Virginia
Rivers of West Virginia